Take Me a_Part, the Remixes (stylized in all caps) is a remix album by American singer and songwriter Kelela, released on October 5, 2018. The album consists of reworkings of songs from Kelela's debut studio album, Take Me Apart (2017), from DJs and producers such as Kaytranada, Rare Essence, Serpentwithfeet, and more.

Release
The album was announced on September 12, 2018, alongside the "LMK (What's Really Good)" remix featuring Princess Nokia, Junglepussy, Cupcakke and Ms. Boogie. The album was released on October 5, 2018, making it one year since the release of Take Me Apart. Kelela contributed new vocals to several of the tracks, with the goal of creating "something far more evolved than the average remix collection."

In a press release, Kelela stated: This project has been evolving in my mind since I was deep in recording Take Me Apart. I obsessed over production choices on the album and my only solace was knowing that the songs would be reimagined in this way [...] so, it's not just a bunch of remixes...it's how my worldwide community of producers and DJs communicate through difference. It's also about the camaraderie that we experience when we find the overlaps. The same songs get to exist in these alternate realities which means different people get to have a relationship with the music. Maybe even with each other.

On September 26, Kelela released Kaytranada's remix of "Waitin" as the second single from the album.

Critical reception

Simon Edwards of The Line of Best Fit said, "Take Me a_Part, the Remixes isn't your ordinary remix album. It's a testament to Kelela's knowledge, taste, and love for underground music," and noted that the album "swerves between house, R&B, juke, gqom and more – spinning you across dancefloors from countries all over the world." Edwards concluded his review writing, "This eclectic mix could be disorientating in the wrong hands, but with Kelela and Asmara at the helm, they somehow manage to create an untold thread that binds all these tracks together. Kelela's deep involvement with the project shows just how committed to her vision she is. Her music is precious, and anyone who wants to step to her sound, better be able to make sure they can hit her high standards. Luckily, Kelela has some pretty talented friends."

Track listing

Notes
 All tracks are stylized in all caps.

Personnel
Credits adapted from the description of the "LMK (What's Really Good)" video on YouTube.
 Kelela – executive production, executive mixing
 Asma Maroof – executive production, executive mixing
 Chris Kasych – engineering, mixing
 Gabriel Schuman – engineering, mixing
 Geoffrey Jerrell – engineering, mixing
 Knice Da Maje – engineering, mixing

References

Articles with underscores in the title
Albums produced by Kaytranada
2018 remix albums
Kelela albums
Warp (record label) albums